In mathematics, the Kirillov model, studied by , is a realization of a representation of GL2 over a local field on a space of functions on the local field.

If G is the algebraic group GL2 and F is a non-Archimedean local field,
and τ is a fixed nontrivial character of the additive group of F
and π is an irreducible representation of G(F), then the Kirillov model for π is 
a representation π on a space of locally constant functions f on F* with compact support in F such that 

 showed that an irreducible representation of dimension greater than 1 has an essentially unique Kirillov model. 
Over a local field, the space of functions with compact support in F* has codimension 0, 1, or 2 in the Kirillov model, depending on whether the irreducible representation is cuspidal, special, or principal. 

The Whittaker model can be constructed from the Kirillov model, by defining the image Wξ of a vector ξ of the Kirillov model by
Wξ(g) = π(g)ξ(1)
where π(g) is the image of g in the Kirillov model.

 defined the Kirillov model  for the general linear group GLn using the mirabolic subgroup. More precisely, a Kirillov model for a representation of the general linear group is an embedding of it in the representation of the mirabolic group induced from a non-degenerate character of the group of upper triangular matrices.

References

Representation theory
Automorphic forms
Langlands program